The Bowl of Hygieia, is one of the symbols of pharmacology, and along with the Rod of Asclepius it is one of the most ancient and important symbols related to medicine in western countries. Hygieia was the Greek goddess of health, hygiene, cleanliness, and sanitation, and the daughter of Asclepius, who she is often closely associated with e.g. in prayers and hymns. Asclepius' symbol is his rod, with a snake twined around it; correspondingly, Hygieia's symbol is a cup or chalice with a snake twined around its stem. Hygieia was also invoked, along with her father Asclepius, and Panacea in the original Hippocratic Oath.

Usage of symbol by pharmaceutical associations 
The bowl of Hygieia has been used as a symbol of the pharmacy profession at least as far back as 1796, when it was used on a coin minted for the Parisian Society of Pharmacy. It has since been adopted by many more pharmaceutical associations worldwide, such as the American Pharmacists Association, the Canadian Pharmacists Association, the Pharmaceutical Society of Australia, and the Doctor of pharmacy Association, Conseil de l'Ordre des Pharmaciens in France (where is written in law with another symbol, the green Greek cross).

The bowl of Hygieia is a common symbol on signs outside of pharmacies in Europe.  A mortar and pestle is a more common symbol in the United States.

References 

Pharmacy
Greek mythology
Heraldic charges
Professional symbols
Medical symbols